This article shows all participating team squads at the 2012 Women's European Water Polo Championship held at the Pieter van den Hoogenband Swim Stadium in Eindhoven, the Netherlands, from 18 to 28 January 2012.

Source

Source

Source

Source

Source

Source

Source

Source

References

Women
Women's European Water Polo Championship
European Water Polo Championship squads
Euro